James Lawrence Austin (August 11, 1913 – December 8, 1995) was an American professional football player who player for the Brooklyn Dodgers and Detroit Lions of the National Football League from 1937 to 1939.

References

1913 births
1995 deaths
Brooklyn Dodgers (NFL) players
Detroit Lions players